Read & Burn 01 is an EP by the English rock band Wire. It is the first in a series of three Read & Burn EPs. It was released on 25 June 2002.

Critical reception
Exclaim! praised "the quality of the material and the genuine fire and raw riffage the band has captured on this recording, invigorating their art with punk yet again." Trouser Press called the EP "fast, loud and hectoring," writing that "more than the sound itself, the attitude and sheer energy of Read & Burn 01 is what gestures back to 1977, as Wire channels the spirit of Pink Flag into a hardcore digital context."

Track listing

Personnel 
 Production
 Denis Blackham – mastering
 Dave Coppenhall – album design
 Graham Lewis – images
 Colin Newman – engineering, mixing

References

External links 
 

2002 EPs
Wire (band) EPs